Myosotis decumbens is a plant species of the genus Myosotis.

decumbens